Tortyra iocyaneus is a moth of the family Choreutidae. It is known from Florida, United States.

The wingspan is about 14 mm.

References

Tortyra
Moths described in 1991